"Pussycat c'est la vie" is a single by the French band Anarchic System, released in 1974, from their first album.

Track listing 
A-side
"Pussycat c'est la vie" (P de Senneville, O. Toussaint, J.L. Detry)

B-side
"Rock and roll is good for you" (P. de Senneville, O. Toussaint)

Personnel
Arrangements and musicians directed by Hervé Roy

Distribution
for France : Delphine Records index catalog 64 007, Distribution Discodis

Anarchic System songs
1974 singles
1974 songs
Songs written by Olivier Toussaint